The Chipmunk Adventure is a 1987 American animated musical-comedy film based on the Saturday-morning cartoon series Alvin and the Chipmunks. Directed by Janice Karman and written by Karman and Ross Bagdasarian Jr., it stars the voices of Karman, Bagdasarian, and Dody Goodman, and follows the Chipmunks and the Chipettes as they go on a hot air balloon race around the world that is the cover for a diamond smuggling ring.

Plot 

When their guardian David Seville goes to Europe on business, the Chipmunks—Alvin, Simon, and Theodore—are left home in Los Angeles with their babysitter, Ms. Miller. Later, the Chipmunks and Chipettes—Brittany, Jeanette, and Eleanor—play the arcade game Around the World in 30 Days, and Alvin and Brittany argue over which would win an actual race around the world. They are overheard by international diamond-smuggling siblings Claudia and Klaus Furschtein, who have $5 million worth of diamonds to distribute to buyers but no couriers who are unknown to their nemesis, Jamal. Claudia tricks the children into being unwitting mules, offering to arrange a real race around the world between the Chipmunks and Chipettes for a $100,000 prize. To participate, Alvin records a phone call to Dave and edits it to trick Ms. Miller into believing that Dave wants the Chipmunks to meet him in Europe.

The two teams set off by hot air balloon, each given a different route and twelve dolls made in their likenesses, which they are to exchange at designated locations for dolls in the likenesses of the other team to confirm they visited the locations. Unbeknownst to them, their dolls are filled with diamonds, and those they are receiving contain cash. The Furschteins' butler, Mario, is secretly an informant for Jamal, who dispatches two of his men to acquire the dolls. The Chipmunks' first stop is Mexico City, where they join in a fiesta. In Bermuda, the Chipettes scuba dive to make their first exchange and Brittany is almost eaten by a shark. The teams continue their journeys, exchanging their dolls in various countries along the way. Jamal's men tail them, but fail to get the dolls due to various mishaps. The teams cross paths in Athens, where they try to outperform one another in a musical number at the Acropolis and are almost spotted by Dave.

Frustrated by his men's failures, Jamal enlists the aid of a young sheikh who has his mercenaries capture the Chipettes in Giza. Rather than turn them over to Jamal, the prince desires instead to marry Brittany, and gifts her a baby penguin. The girls perform a song to charm the cobras guarding their dolls, escape in their balloon, and detour to Antarctica to return the baby penguin to its family. Learning that they have deviated from their route, Claudia sends her thugs after them. The girls escape, but discover the diamonds and cash inside the dolls, realize they have been deceived and set out to find the boys. 

Meanwhile, the Chipmunks take a shortcut through a jungle, where they are captured by a native tribe who name Theodore their "Prince of Plenty" and force Alvin and Simon to be his slaves. They soon learn that they are to be sacrificed by being dropped into a pit of crocodiles. By performing the song "Wooly Bully" to entertain the natives, they stall their execution and are rescued by the Chipettes.

Claudia discovers Mario passing information to Jamal, who is revealed to be an Interpol Inspector. The children land at Los Angeles International Airport at the same time as Dave's returning flight, and are chased by the Furschteins, who get them to surrender by falsely saying that they have kidnapped Ms. Miller. Dave sees them being taken away in the Furschteins' car, and joins Jamal in pursuit. Ms. Miller is absentmindedly driving the wrong way on a one-way street on her way to pick up Dave, and accidentally runs the Furschteins off the road. They are arrested by Jamal, and the children are reunited with Dave. Alvin and Brittany argue over who won the race, much to the adults' frustration.

Voice cast 
 Ross Bagdasarian Jr. as Alvin, Simon, and David Seville
 Janice Karman as Theodore Seville, and Brittany, Jeanette and Eleanor Miller
 Dody Goodman as Miss Miller
 Susan Tyrrell as Claudia Furschtein
 Anthony De Longis as Klaus Furschtein
 Frank Welker as Sophie, Baby Penguin, Native Chief, and additional voices
 Ken Sansom as Inspector Jamal
 Nancy Cartwright as the Arabian prince

Production 
After the success of his animated cartoon series on NBC, Ross Bagdasarian, Jr. began developing a concept for a full-length feature film. The box-office failure of Disney's The Black Cauldron in 1985 had led to the layoff of a number of Walt Disney Productions animators (such as Glen Keane, Dan Haskett and Dave Pruiksma), whom Bagdasarian promptly hired to work on the film. Haskett already was a part of the 1983 series by the time he was hired to work on the film. 

Bagdasarian and his wife Janice Karman decided to finance themselves, having generated so much revenue from the TV series. While much of the work was done in New York, most of the animation was done in Los Angeles. The ink and paint, however, were done over in Korea. Their decision to work with several overseas studios led to major production delays. By late 1986, production had fallen far behind schedule, and a shortage of time and money resulted in major cuts being made; one deleted scene had the Chipmunks go to Russia. Some storyboards and animatics were released on the 2006 DVD issue.

Music 

The soundtrack of The Chipmunk Adventure was performed by the Chipmunks and the Chipettes and includes a mix of original tunes and covers. The film's score was composed by Randy Edelman, who also contributed some of the songs for the film. Several songs throughout the film were performed by both the Chipmunks and the Chipettes. The soundtrack was originally released by Buena Vista Records. On April 1, 2008, the soundtrack was re-released as a bonus CD with the film's DVD.

Songs

Release 
The film was promoted one year before its release, at the 1986 Cannes Film Festival.

Though initially scheduled for Christmas 1986, The Chipmunk Adventure opened on May 22, 1987 through The Samuel Goldwyn Company and Bagdasarian Productions. With an opening weekend take of $2,584,720, it ultimately grossed $6,804,312 in North America alone.

Critical reception 
Janet Maslin of The New York Times commentated that the film is enjoyable for both parents and children. In his Family Guide to Movies on Video, Henry Herx deemed the film a "charming, lighthearted diversion for the younger set", and remarked that it resembled "a musical revue of pop tunes". Johanna Steinmetz of Chicago Tribune gave the film three stars out of four, stating that the inclusion of the minor characters (especially the villains) would "[keep] an adult viewer from insulin crisis."

Film critic Paul McKie praised the "superior" animation and  the "delightful pair of villains", but criticized the Chipettes for "[not having] personalities of their own." Charles Solomon of The Los Angeles Times commented "listening to six little characters talk and sing in speeded-up falsetto voices for 76 minutes becomes a real test of the viewer's endurance." Solomon also said that the villains resembled those from a Ralph Bakshi film and did not fit with the world of the Chipmunks. Roger Ebert commented that the animation is slightly better than the TV series, but criticized the film's "dumb and predictable" story, while Gene Siskel criticized the plot for being right out of a Saturday morning cartoon, especially through the film's introduction of the Chipettes. Both Ebert and Siskel also criticized the plot and the Chipmunks' voices, with Ebert comparing them to "fingernails on the blackboard". Siskel and Ebert ultimately gave the film two thumbs down.

On review aggregation website Rotten Tomatoes, the film has an approval rating of 75% based on 8 reviews, with an average rating of 6.6/10.

Home media 
The film was released on VHS by Lorimar Home Video in late 1987, Warner Home Video in 1992, and Universal Studios Home Video on March 17, 1998. On May 23, 2006, the film was released on DVD by Paramount Home Entertainment digitally remastered from the original 35mm film and presented with 5.1 surround sound. A special edition DVD re-release of the film with a bonus CD (which is the same soundtrack disc) was released on April 1, 2008, which matches that of the live-action/computer-animated Alvin and the Chipmunks and another DVD volume of Alvin and the Chipmunks Go to the Movies. On March 25, 2014, the film was released on Blu-ray for the first time.

References

External links 

 
 
 
 
 

Alvin and the Chipmunks films
1987 films
1987 animated films
1987 soundtrack albums
1980s adventure films
1980s American animated films
1980s musical comedy films
1980s English-language films
Alvin and the Chipmunks albums
American adventure comedy films
American children's animated adventure films
American children's animated comedy films
American children's animated musical films
American musical comedy films
Animated coming-of-age films
Children's music albums
Films about child abduction
Films about princes
Films about slavery
Films scored by Randy Edelman
Films directed by Janice Karman
Films featuring underwater diving
Films set in Antarctica
Films set in Athens
Films set in Bermuda
Films set in Egypt
Films set in jungles
Films set in Los Angeles
Films set in Mexico City
Films set on balloons
Jukebox musical films
Animated films based on animated series
The Samuel Goldwyn Company films
1980s children's animated films
Comedy film soundtracks
1987 comedy films
Films with screenplays by Ross Bagdasarian Jr.
Films produced by Ross Bagdasarian Jr.
Films with screenplays by Janice Karman